The Dance of the Voodoo Handbag is a novel by the British author Robert Rankin that incorporates elements of fantasy and science fiction.

References

Novels by Robert Rankin
1998 British novels
British fantasy novels
Doubleday (publisher) books